Angels of Destruction! is an album by the band Marah.  It was released by Yep Roc Records on January 8, 2008.

Track listing 
 Coughing Up Blood
 Old Time Tickin' Away
 Angels on a Passing Train
 Wild West Love Song
 Blue But Cool
 Jesus in the Temple
 Santos de Madera
 Songbirds
 Angels of Destruction
 Can't Take it With You
 Wilderness (contains a hidden track, Tippecanoe County Correctional Theme Park Blues)

Personnel 

 Dave Bielanko – vocals, guitar, banjo
 Serge Bielanko – guitar, vocals, harmonica
 Kirk Henderson – bass
 Dave Petersen – drums, vocals
 Adam Garbinsky - guitar
 Christine Smith - keyboards, vocals

References

2008 albums
Marah (band) albums